West End is a district near the centre of Aberdeen, Scotland.  It extends across Queens Road and Great Western Road. West End ends at Anderson Drive/South Anderson Drive.

Areas of Aberdeen